14 Hours is a 2005 medical emergency docudrama produced for the TNT Network and starring JoBeth Williams, Kris Kristofferson and Ricky Schroder. The film was set in Houston, Texas and filmed in Vancouver, Canada. Based on true-life events surrounding Tropical Storm Allison in 2001, the film was released internationally on DVD by Paramount Pictures. 14 Hours was produced through Cosmic Entertainment, which counts Kurt Russell, Goldie Hawn, Oliver Hudson and Kate Hudson as its principals, and sponsored by Johnson & Johnson. The Decades channel aired this movie in March 2017.

Plot

Cast
 JoBeth Williams as Jeanette Makins
 Kris Kristofferson as Chuck Whortle
Kirsten Robek as Nurse Lily
 Kevin McNulty as Larry Dastych
Jason Schombing  as Bronson
 Rick Schroder as Dr. Foster
Kim Roberts as Helen
Karin Konoval as Dr. Estrada
Simone Bailly as Phoebe
Rick Dobran as Gary

Backstory
Houston native JoBeth Williams weathered her share of tropical storm and hurricane conditions as a child.  Her mother worked as a dietician at Memorial-Herrmann (the Houston-area hospital where 14 Hours is set) for 18 years.
The premature baby in the movie is based in Zachary Jackson's struggle to survive not only prematurity but also the loss of power to his life-support equipment when he weighed around 2 lbs (1 kilogram). He is now a healthy teenager in the Houston Metropolitan area, and did a fundraiser to make Relief Boxes full of preemie essentials to victims of Hurricane Harvey and delivered them to Intensive Care Units.
The producers were inspired by the Reader's Digest article "BLACKOUT" by Peter Michelmore published in April 2002.

References

External links

2005 television films
2005 films
Films set in Houston
Films shot in Vancouver
Disaster films based on actual events
Medical-themed films
2005 action drama films
American action drama films
American disaster films
American films based on actual events
Paramount Pictures films
TNT Network original films
Films directed by Gregg Champion
American drama television films
2000s American films